The men's individual compound competition at the 2013 World Archery Championships took place on 29 September – 6 October 2013 in Belek, Turkey.

102 archers from 44 countries entered the competition, with a maximum of three entries per country. All archers qualified for the 7-round knockout tournament, with the top 8 scores in qualifying receiving a bye to the third round. The reigning champion was Christopher Perkins of Canada.

Schedule
All times are local (UTC+02:00).

Qualification round
Pre-tournament world rankings ('WR') are taken from the 28 August 2013 World Archery Rankings. The qualification round consisted of two sessions of 36 arrows at 50m, with equal scores separated by number of 10s, then number of X's and world ranking.

 Bye to third round 
 Qualified for eliminations

Elimination rounds

Top half

Section 1

Section 2

Section 3

Section 4

Bottom half

Section 5

Section 6

Section 7

Section 8

Finals

References

2013 World Archery Championships